Dahlia is a genus of moths of the family Noctuidae.

Species
 Dahlia capnobela Turner, 1902
 Dahlia hesperioides Pagenstecher, 1900

References
 Dahlia at Markku Savela's Lepidoptera and Some Other Life Forms
 Natural History Museum Lepidoptera genus database

Calpinae
Noctuoidea genera
Taxa named by Arnold Pagenstecher